$upercapitalist (also advertised as Supercapitalist) is a Hong Kong-based financial thriller. The film's official release was on  via the day-and-date film distribution model, thereby being available simultaneously in movie theaters and on cable and Internet video on demand through Warner Bros. Digital and Gravitas. It premiered at the Asian American International Film Festival.

Cast
 Linus Roache as Mark Patterson
 Kenneth Tsang as Victor Chang
 Derek Ting as Conner Lee
 Richard Ng as Donald Chang
 Michael Park as Morris Brown
 Kathy Uyen as Natalie Wang
 Darren E. Scott as Quentin Wong

Reception
$upercapitalist was well received by financial publications with New York Times Dealbook reporting on the film, and then Christia Freeland "Film Tackles Capitalism and Identity" but mostly poorly received by film critics though it was not widely reviewed. On Rotten Tomatoes the film has an approval rating of 18% based on reviews from 11 critics.

References

External links

 
 
 
 $upercapitalist at Fandango

2012 films
2012 thriller films
American thriller films
Hong Kong thriller films
Films about Chinese Americans
Chinese-language films
Films shot in New York City
Films shot in Hong Kong
Films shot in Macau
Chinese-language American films
2010s English-language films
2010s American films
2010s Hong Kong films